Skehana or Skehanagh is a small village and townland in County Galway, Ireland. The name Skehana derives from the Irish Sceith eánach meaning "place of the whitethorn". 

Together with nearby Menlough, Skehana is a half-parish within the diocesan parish of Killascobe in the Roman Catholic Archdiocese of Tuam. An annual arts festival was held there in the late 1980s and early 1990s. The local Gaelic Athletic Association club, Skehana Hurling Club, fields hurling teams at underage and adult Junior A grades.

The ruins of an Anglo-Norman tower house, Garbally Castle, are located immediately to the west of the local national school.

See also
 List of towns and villages in Ireland

References

External links
 Skehana.org - Skehana & District Heritage website

Towns and villages in County Galway